Bishop Bohdan Dzyurakh, C.Ss.R. (b. 1967, Hirske, Lviv Oblast, Ukrainian SSR) is a curial bishop of the Ukrainian Greek Catholic Church and titular bishop of Vagada.  He is also head of the Supervisory Council of the Construction of the Patriarchal Center of the UGCC.  He was ordained priest on 17 March 1991 and was consecrated bishop on 15 February 2006. On 18 February 2021 Dzyurakh was appointed as head of the Ukrainian Catholic Apostolic Exarchate of Germany and Scandinavia, succeeding the retiring Petro Kryk.

References

External links

 Official website of the Ukrainian Catholic Archeparchy of Kyiv (in Ukrainian).

1967 births
Living people
People from Lviv Oblast
Bishops of the Ukrainian Greek Catholic Church
Redemptorist bishops